This is a list of people executed in the United States in 2023. To date, nine people have been executed in the United States in 2023, all by lethal injection.

List of people executed in the United States in 2023

Demographics

Executions in recent years

See also
 List of death row inmates in the United States
 List of juveniles executed in the United States since 1976
 List of most recent executions by jurisdiction
 List of people executed in Texas, 2020–present
 List of people scheduled to be executed in the United States
 List of women executed in the United States since 1976

Notes

References

Executions
People executed in the United States
2023